Wellington (also Wellingtons or Wellingtons Station) is an unincorporated town in southwestern Lyon County, Nevada, United States.  It lies along State Route 208, southwest of the city of Yerington, the county seat of Lyon County.  Wellington has a post office with the ZIP code 89444,

History
A post office was first established at Wellington in 1865.  The community was named after one Major Wellington, a businessperson in the stagecoach industry.

References

External links
 Official Wellington website

Unincorporated communities in Lyon County, Nevada
Unincorporated communities in Nevada